The 1974–75 Israel State Cup (Gvia HaMedina) was the 36th season of Israel's nationwide football cup competition and the 21st after the Israeli Declaration of Independence.

The competition was won by Hapoel Kfar Saba, who have beaten Beitar Jerusalem 3–1 at the final.

Results

First round

Second round

Third round

Fourth round

Round of 16

|}

Quarter-finals

|}

Semi-finals

Final

References
100 Years of Football 1906-2006, Elisha Shohat (Israel), 2006, pp. 235-236
Tiv'on drowned Tiberias - With five (Page 2) Hadshot HaSport, 15.9.1974, archive.football.co.il 
Cup (Pages 3-4) Hadshot HaSport, 22.9.1974, archive.football.co.il 
Hapoel Dimona - Maccabi Jerusalem 5-0 (1-0) Maariv, 22.9.1974, Historical Jewish Press 
Jonathan's Hat-trick stunned Kiryat Tiv'on (Page 4) Hadshot HaSport, 25.9.1974, archive.football.co.il 
Cup (Pages 3-4) Hadshot HaSport, 29.9.1974, archive.football.co.il 
Cup (Pages 2-3) Hadshot HaSport, 9.10.1974, archive.football.co.il 

Israel State Cup
State Cup
Israel State Cup seasons